Katelin "Keke" Lindgard is an American fashion model.

Early life
Katelin Lindgard was born in Hawaii, and has a sister named Lilli.

Career
Lindgard signed with Wilhelmina Models at age 15, and debuted at Rag & Bone. She then walked for brands including Prada, Miu Miu, Hermès, Céline, Louis Vuitton, DKNY, Tommy Hilfiger, Vera Wang, Bottega Veneta, Dolce & Gabbana, Giambattista Valli, Lanvin, Valentino, Armani Privé, and Dior. She has done campaigns for Gucci, Ralph Lauren, D&G, Trussardi, and DKNY.

Lindgard walked in the 2016 Victoria’s Secret Fashion Show.

References

Living people
1994 births
People from Oahu
Female models from Hawaii
American female models
Women Management models
Elite Model Management models
21st-century American women